Fly Guys is an American reality show series that premiered on February 2, 2018 on Facebook Watch. It follows a group of acrobats and stunt artists as they carry out a new and difficult stunt in each episode.

Premise
Fly Guys follows "an all-star crew of Europe’s most talented acrobats and professional stunt performers. Each episode explores what it takes to safely and successfully pull off a world-class stunt."

Production

Development
On January 16, 2018, it was announced that Facebook Watch had given the production a series order for a first season consisting of ten episodes. Executive producers are set to include Jonathan Skogmo and Josh Entman. The animated graphics for 10 episodes are produced and created by Marina Gvozdeva and Kate Presbury. Production companies involved with the series include Jukin Media.

Marketing
Simultaneously with the initial series announcement, Facebook released a trailer for the first season of the show.

Episodes

See also
 List of original programs distributed by Facebook Watch

References

External links
 

Facebook Watch original programming
2010s American reality television series
2018 American television series debuts
2018 American television series endings
English-language television shows
American non-fiction web series